Smitherman is a surname. Notable people with the surname include:
   
George Smitherman (born 1964), Canadian politician
Carole Smitherman (born 1952), American politician, served as City Councilor and Mayor of Birmingham, Alabama
Rodger Smitherman, American politician, Democratic member of the Alabama Senate
Christopher Smitherman, American politician, Cincinnati City Council
Stephen Smitherman (born 1978), American Major League Baseball left fielder
Joseph T. Smitherman (1929–2005), American politician, Mayor of Selma, Alabama from 1964 to 2000
Joseph T. Smitherman Historic Building, a historical building in Selma